{{Infobox settlement
| name                     = South Tangerang
| native_name              = 
| official_name            = City of South Tangerang{{nobold|Kota Tangerang Selatan}}
| settlement_type          = City
| translit_lang1           = Other
| translit_lang1_type1     = Sundanese
| translit_lang1_info1     = 
| translit_lang1_type2     = 
| translit_lang1_info2     = 
| image_skyline            = 
| image_caption            = From top, left to right:Former South Tangerang city hall, Pandang Tower, Bintaro Avenue, Jaletreng Riverpark
| image_flag               = Flag of South Tangerang City.png
| image_shield             = Lambang Kota Tangerang Selatan.svg
| shield_size              = 
| image_blank_emblem       = 
| blank_emblem_size        = 
| sports_nickname          = 
| motto                    = Cerdas, Modern, Religius  (Intelligent, Modern, Religious)
| image_map                = Locator Kota Tangerang Selatan.png
| mapsize                  = 
| map_caption              = Location within Banten
| pushpin_map              = Indonesia_Java#Indonesia
| pushpin_label_position   = right
| pushpin_map_caption      = Location in Java and Indonesia
| coordinates              = 
| subdivision_type         = Country
| subdivision_name         = Indonesia
| subdivision_type1        = Province
| subdivision_name1        = Banten
| established_title        = Granted city status
| established_date         = 26 November 2008
| established_title2       = 
| established_date2        = 
| established_title3       = 
| established_date3        = 
| government_type          = 
| leader_title             = Mayor
| leader_name              = 
| leader_title1            = Vice Mayor
| leader_name1             = 
| area_magnitude           = 
| area_total_km2           = 164.85
| area_total_sq_mi         = 
| area_land_km2            = 123.58
| area_land_sq_mi          = 
| area_water_km2           = 23.61
| area_water_sq_mi         = 
| area_water_percent       = 
| area_urban_km2           = 
| area_urban_sq_mi         = 
| area_metro_km2           = 
| area_metro_sq_mi         = 
| elevation_m              = 
| elevation_ft             = 
| population_total         = 1378466 
| population_as_of         = mid 2022 estimate
| population_density_km2   = auto
| population_density_sq_mi = 
| population_urban         = 
| population_density_urban_km2 = 
| population_metro         = 
| population_density_metro_km2 = 
| population_density_metro_sq_mi = 
| population_note          = 
| postal_code_type         = Postcodes
| postal_code              = 15xxx
| area_code                = (+62) 21
| area_code_type           = Area code
| website                  = 
| blank_name               = HDI (2022)
| blank_info               =  0.820
| footnotes                = 
| leader_title2            = 
| leader_name2             = 
| leader_title3            = 
| leader_name3             = 
| population_density_urban_mi2 = 
| HDI                      = 
| timezone                 = Indonesia Western Time
| utc_offset               = +7
| timezone_DST             = 
| utc_offset_DST           = 
}}
South Tangerang is a city in the province of Banten, Indonesia. Located  on the southwestern border of Jakarta, the city forms part of the Greater Jakarta metropolitan area. It was administratively separated from Tangerang Regency on 26 November 2008. According to the 2020 Census, the city population was 1,354,350 inhabitants, while the official estimate as at mid 2022 was 1,378,466 . It's the second-largest city in Banten (after Tangerang city immediately to its north) in terms of population, and has grown rapidly, not only as Jakarta's satellite city, but also the development of business districts and commerce due to presence of large-scale planned town by private developers.

South Tangerang is home to some planned towns built by private developers, the notable ones are Alam Sutera (in North Serpong), BSD City (in Serpong and Setu), and Bintaro Jaya (in Pondok Aren and Ciputat), complete with facilities such as business centres, shopping malls, and international schools. Currently, its average land price is the most expensive among Jakarta's satellite cities.

 History 
The municipality of South Tangerang is an autonomous city established on 26 November 2008, based on Banten province's constitution. This establishment was a division out of the Tangerang Regency, to support the better development of government service, construction project, community service, and also to utilize the natural potential so that a greater public welfare could be achieved.

 Administrative districts 
The municipality of South Tangerang is divided into seven districts (kecamatan), tabulated below with their areas and population totals from the 2010 Census and 2020 Census, together with the official estimates as at mid 2022. The centre of South Tangerang is the Ciputat district; the western districts of the city (Setu, Serpong and Serpong Utara) are much less densely populated than the eastern districts (Pamulang, Ciputat, Ciputat Timur and Pondok Aren). The table also includes the number of administrative villages (rural desa and urban kelurahan) in each district, and its postal codes. The districts are sub-divided into 49 urban villages (kelurahan) and five rural villages (desa).

 Climate 
South Tangerang has a tropical rainforest climate (Af) with moderate rainfall from June to September and heavy rainfall from October to May.

 Transportation 

The city is served mainly by land transportation. Buses, minibuses and taxis are the main methods of transportation available. The public transportation mostly goes to Jakarta since many of the residents of South Tangerang commute to Jakarta on a daily basis. There are feeder buses for TransJakarta. The feeder buses goes from Bumi Serpong Damai and Bintaro Jaya to downtown Jakarta in Senayan.

Main road and highway in the city are:

Main road:
 Jl. Raya Serpong
 Jl. Pahlawan Seribu, BSD City
 Jl. Kapten Soebianto Djojohadjikusumo, BSD City
 Jl. Pelayangan, BSD City
 Jl. Ir. H. Juanda, Ciputat
 Jl. Ciater Raya
 Jl. Alam Sutera Boulevard
 Jl. Boulevard Bintaro Jaya

Highway:
 Jakarta-Serpong Toll Road (connecting Serpong and South Jakarta/JORR 1)
 Serpong-Cinere Toll Road (connecting Serpong and Cinere in Depok)
 Kunciran-Serpong Toll Road (connecting Kunciran in Tangerang City/Soekarno Hatta Airport and Serpong)
 Serpong-Balaraja Toll Road (in progress for section 1A) (connecting Serpong and Balaraja in Tangerang Regency)

The city is also served by commuter rail service KRL Commuterline for those commuters who work in Jakarta. All stations serves the Tanah Abang – Rangkasbitung Line.

There are two toll roads servicing the city, namely Jakarta–Serpong Toll Road and Jakarta–Tangerang Toll Road. There are also several toll roads currently under planning. The plans are for a Serpong-Balaraja Toll Road which will continue the Jakarta-Serpong toll road, and Jakarta Outer Ring Road 2 which will be connecting the city to Soekarno–Hatta International Airport in the near future. Kunciran-Serpong Toll Road and Serpong-Cinere Toll Road are the latest new infrastructure built in the city.

Pondok Cabe Airport – which is used for military and civilian services – is the only airport located within the city boundaries. It is owned by PT Pertamina, the national oil company. The airport is also used for the maintenance base for Pelita Air Service, also owned by PT Pertamina.

Cycle rickshaws (becak) are still available in some areas in the city. Becak is the only method of transportation currently forbidden to operate in Jakarta as its slow speed has allegedly led to congestion in the traffic of Jakarta. However, since South Tangerang is located on the outskirts of Jakarta (instead of the city proper), it is allowed in the city.

In April 2015, Corridor-2 of Trans Anggrek Circle Line which is similar to TransJakarta has been launched to serve public from Pondok Cabe Terminal to Rawa Buntu Station of KRL Jabodetabek. It was free until end of 2015, but only operated between 06:00–09:00, 11:00-14:00 and 16:00–18:00 with notation time of serve will be added as needed. The other seven corridors will be applied gradually.

 Shopping 
South Tangerang offers some shopping center in the area, such as:
 Living World Alam Sutera
 Bintaro Xchange Mall
 Plaza Bintaro Jaya
 BSD Plaza
 TerasKota Entertainment Center BSD
 Transpark Mall Bintaro
 LOTTE Mall Bintaro
 ITC BSD
 Mall WTC Matahari Serpong
 BSD Junction
 AEON Mall, BSD
 Paradise Walk Serpong

 Education 
Education in South Tangerang consists of the standard Elementary through High School facilities found in most of Indonesia, kindergartens are operated privately. Below are several notable schools in South Tangerang:

 International Schools 

 Jakarta Japanese School, (Bintaro Jaya)
 Global Jaya School, (Bintaro Jaya)
 German International School Jakarta (BSD City)
 Sinarmas World Academy (BSD City)
 British School Jakarta (Bintaro Jaya)
 BINUS Serpong, Cambridge International School (BSD City)
 Khalifa IMS Bintaro, Cambridge International School
 Mentari Intercultural School Bintaro

 Private Schools 
 SMK Musik Yayasan Musik Jakarta
 Santa Ursula BSD
 Santa Laurensia School (Alam Sutera)
 BPK Penabur Bintaro Jaya
 SMA Plus Pembangunan Jaya
 SMA Efata Serpong
 SMA Candle Tree
 SMA Islam Cikal Harapan BSD
 SMA Islam Sinar Cendekia
 SMA Stella Maris BSD
 SMA Islam Al Azhar BSD
 Saint John Catholic School BSD
 Sekolah Athalia Villa Melati Mas
 Kharisma Bangsa School
 Sekolah Harapan Bangsa, Modernhill Pondok Cabe
 Ora Et Labora BSD
 TK SD SMP Ora Et Labora Pamulang
 SMK Pustek
 SMA Yaspita
 Strada Villa Melati Mas
 Solideo BSD
 SMAK PENABUR Bintaro Jaya
 SD Islam At Taqwa
 MI As Salaamah Pamulang
 SMA Muhammadiyah 25 Pamulang
 SMA Muhammadiyah 8 Ciputat
 SD SMP SMA Katolik Ricci 2
 TK SD SMP SMA Katolik Bhakti Prima
 Sekolah Mater Dei Pamulang
 SMK Sasmita Jaya (SMK Sasmita Jaya)

 Public Schools 
 SMAN 1 Tangerang Selatan
 SMAN 2 Tangerang Selatan
 SMAN 3 Tangerang Selatan
 SMAN 4 Tangerang Selatan
 SMAN 5 Tangerang Selatan
 SMAN 6 Tangerang Selatan
 SMAN 8 Tangerang Selatan
 SMAN 9 Tangerang Selatan
 SMAN 10 Tangerang Selatan
 SMAN 11 Tangerang Selatan
 SMAN 12 Tangerang Selatan
 MAN Insan Cendekia

 Public universities 
 Universitas Terbuka UIN Syarif Hidayatullah

 Government-affiliated colleges 
 Sekolah Tinggi Akutansi Negara
 Geophysics and Meteorology Academy (Sekolah Tinggi Meteorologi Klimatologi dan Geofisika)

 Private Universities 
 Muhammadiyah Jakarta University (Universitas Muhammadiyah Jakarta)
 Pamulang University (Universitas Pamulang)
 Indonesian Institute of Technology (Institut Teknologi Indonesia)
 Pembangunan Jaya University (UPJ)
 Bina Sarana Informatika University (UBSI BSD)
 BINUS ASO School of Engineering
 International University Liaison Indonesia (IULI)
 South Tangerang Institute of Technology (ITTS)
 Sekolah Tinggi Internasional Konservatori Musik Indonesia (STIKMI'')

See also 
 Tangerang
 Tangerang Regency
 Jakarta metropolitan area

References

External links 

 Sekolah dan Daycare Alam Sutera
 Official website

 
Populated places in Banten